The 1991 Pacific Tigers football team represented the University of the Pacific (UOP) in the 1991 NCAA Division I-A football season as a member of the Big West Conference.

The team was led by head coach Walt Harris, in his third year, and played their home games at Stagg Memorial Stadium in Stockton, California. They finished the season with a record of five wins and seven losses (5–7, 4–3 Big West). In a very high-scoring season, the Tigers were outscored by their opponents 435–481. Included in that total are three games where the Tigers scored over 50 points (56 vs. Cal State Fullerton, 63 vs. Cal Poly & 51 vs. Cal State Long Beach) and four games where the Tigers gave up over 50 points (86 vs. California, 55 vs. San Diego State, 64 vs. San Jose State, and 59 vs. Fresno State).

Schedule

References

Pacific
Pacific Tigers football seasons
Pacific Tigers football